In statistics, canonical-correlation analysis (CCA), also called canonical variates analysis, is a way of inferring information from cross-covariance matrices. If we have two vectors X = (X1, ..., Xn) and Y = (Y1, ..., Ym)  of random variables, and there are correlations among the variables, then canonical-correlation analysis will find linear combinations of X and Y which have maximum correlation with each other. T. R. Knapp notes that "virtually all of the commonly encountered parametric tests of significance can be treated as special cases of canonical-correlation analysis, which is the general procedure for investigating the relationships between two sets of variables." The method was first introduced by Harold Hotelling in 1936, although in the context of angles between flats the mathematical concept was published by Jordan in 1875.

Definition

Canonical-correlation analysis seeks vectors   and  such that the random variables  and  maximize the correlation . Then one seeks vectors maximizing the same correlation subject to the constraint that they are to be uncorrelated with the first pair of canonical variables; this gives the second pair of canonical variables. This procedure may be continued up to  times.

Computation

Derivation
The target function to maximize is

The first step is to define a change of basis and define

And thus we have

By the Cauchy–Schwarz inequality, we have

In addition, the maximum of correlation is attained if  is the eigenvector with the maximum eigenvalue for the matrix  (see Rayleigh quotient). The subsequent pairs are found by using eigenvalues of decreasing magnitudes. Orthogonality is guaranteed by the symmetry of the correlation matrices.

Solution
The solution is therefore:
  is an eigenvector of 
  is proportional to 

Reciprocally, there is also:
  is an eigenvector of 
  is proportional to 

Reversing the change of coordinates, we have that
  is proportional to 
  is an eigenvector of 

The canonical variables are defined by:

Implementation
CCA can be computed using singular value decomposition on a correlation matrix. It is available as a function in

 MATLAB as canoncorr (also in Octave) 
 R as the standard function cancor and several other packages, including CCA and vegan. CCP for statistical hypothesis testing in canonical correlation analysis.
 SAS as proc cancorr
 Python in the library scikit-learn, as Cross decomposition and in statsmodels, as CanCorr.
 SPSS as macro CanCorr shipped with the main software
Julia (programming language) in the MultivariateStats.jl package.

CCA computation using singular value decomposition on a correlation matrix is related to the cosine of the angles between flats. The cosine function is ill-conditioned for small angles, leading to very inaccurate computation of highly correlated principal vectors in finite precision computer arithmetic. To  fix this trouble, alternative algorithms are available in

 SciPy as linear-algebra function subspace_angles 
 MATLAB as FileExchange function subspacea

Hypothesis testing
Each row can be tested for significance with the following method. Since the correlations are sorted, saying that row  is zero implies all further correlations are also zero. For the th row, the test statistic is:

which is asymptotically distributed as a chi-squared with  degrees of freedom for large .

Note that in the small sample size limit with  then we are guaranteed that the top  correlations will be identically 1 and hence the test is meaningless.

Practical uses
A typical use for canonical correlation in the experimental context is to take two sets of variables and see what is common among the two sets. For example, in psychological testing, one could take two well established multidimensional personality tests such as the Minnesota Multiphasic Personality Inventory (MMPI-2) and the NEO. By seeing how the MMPI-2 factors relate to the NEO factors, one could gain insight into what dimensions were common between the tests and how much variance was shared. For example, one might find that an extraversion or neuroticism dimension accounted for a substantial amount of shared variance between the two tests.

One can also use canonical-correlation analysis to produce a model equation which relates two sets of variables, for example a set of performance measures and a set of explanatory variables, or a set of outputs and set of inputs. Constraint restrictions can be imposed on such a model to ensure it reflects theoretical requirements or intuitively obvious conditions. This type of model is known as a maximum correlation model.

Visualization of the results of canonical correlation is usually through bar plots of the coefficients of the two sets of variables for the pairs of canonical variates showing significant correlation. Some authors suggest that they are best visualized by plotting them as heliographs, a circular format with ray like bars, with each half representing the two sets of variables.

Examples
Let  with zero expected value, i.e., . 

We notice that in both cases , which illustrates that the canonical-correlation analysis treats correlated and anticorrelated variables similarly.

Connection to principal angles

The canonical correlations  is equal to the cosine of principal angles.

Whitening and probabilistic canonical correlation analysis

The regression view of CCA also provides a way to construct a latent variable probabilistic generative model for CCA, with uncorrelated hidden variables representing shared and non-shared variability.

See also
Generalized canonical correlation
RV coefficient
Angles between flats
Principal component analysis
Linear discriminant analysis
Regularized canonical correlation analysis
Singular-value decomposition
Partial least squares regression

References

External links
 Discriminant Correlation Analysis (DCA) (MATLAB)
 
 A note on the ordinal canonical-correlation analysis of two sets of ranking scores (Also provides a FORTRAN program)- in Journal of Quantitative Economics 7(2), 2009, pp. 173–199
 Representation-Constrained Canonical Correlation Analysis: A Hybridization of Canonical Correlation and Principal Component Analyses (Also provides a FORTRAN program)- in Journal of Applied Economic Sciences 4(1), 2009, pp. 115–124

Covariance and correlation